The Ulm–Augsburg  line is a German railway line. It was constructed as part of the Bavarian Maximilian's Railway. It was built for the Royal Bavarian State Railways as part of the east-west connection between Neu-Ulm in the west via Augsburg, Munich and Rosenheim to the Austrian border at Kufstein and Salzburg in the east.

History 

The line was constructed as part of the Bavarian Maximilian Railway (German:Bayerische Maximiliansbahn), named after Maximilian II, king of Bavaria from 1848 to 1864. In 1851, it was decided to build a line connecting the German states and Italy via the Brenner Pass and via Salzburg towards Vienna and the Semmering Pass. It promised good traffic flows to and from the Austrian Adriatic port at Trieste.  Appropriate conventions were agreed with the Kingdom of Württemberg and with the Austrian government in 1851.  The Munich–Augsburg line, which had been opened by the Munich–Augsburg Railway Company (München-Augsburger Eisenbahn-Gesellschaft) in 1839 and 1840 and nationalised in 1846 was included in the new line.

The line connected to the Württemberg Southern Railway in Ulm and ran for 84 kilometers to Augsburg.

Construction 
The 83.7 km line from Augsburg to Ulm was opened in four sections:
 1 May 1854 – Mitte Donaubrücke Ulm–Neu-Ulm, 1.3 km.
 26 September 1853 – Neu-Ulm–Burgau, 38.1 km.
 1 May 1854 – Burgau–Dinkelscherben, 17.9 km.
 26 September 1853 – Dinkelscherben–Augsburg, 26.4 km.

The line today 
The line is a major traffic axis. Every hour or two Intercity-Express and InterCity trains run from Munich via Augsburg and Ulm to Stuttgart and from there to various other destinations.

Ulm–Augsburg upgraded line
The line between Ulm and Augsburg is part of the Stuttgart–Augsburg new and upgraded line project. Eventually this line should be part of the Magistrale for Europe from Paris via Strasbourg, Stuttgart and Ulm to Munich, Salzburg and Vienna.

Notes

References
Ücker, Bernhard, 150 Jahre Eisenbahn in Bayern, Fürstenfeldbruck 1985 
 Wolfgang Klee/Ludwig v. Welser, Bayern-Report, volumes 1–5, Fürstenfeldbruck, 1993–1995. 
Dt. Reichsbahn, Die deutschen Eisenbahnen in ihrer Entwicklung 1835–1935, Berlin, 1935.

External links 
Deutsche Bahn site for the NBS/ABS Augsburg-Olching-München project 

Railway lines in Bavaria
Rail transport in Augsburg
Transport in Ulm
Railway lines opened in 1853
1853 establishments in Bavaria
Buildings and structures in Augsburg (district)
Buildings and structures in Günzburg (district)
Neu-Ulm (district)